The Lower Central Province was a two-member electoral province of the Western Australian Legislative Council, located in the South West and Great Southern regions of the state. It was one of several rural seats created following the enactment of the Constitution Acts Amendment Act (No.2) 1963, and became effective on 22 May 1965. Although initially a safe seat for the Country Party, it usually only contained one safe Assembly seat for that party, and by 1983, the Liberal Party were able to maintain both seats comfortably.

In 1989, the province was abolished by the Acts Amendment (Electoral Reform) Act 1987, and was divided between the Agricultural and South West regions under the new proportional voting system.

Geography
The province was made up of several complete Legislative Assembly districts, which changed at each distribution.

Representation

Members

 Sandy Lewis resigned from the Liberal Party in March 1986 following the decision by the Shadow Ministry to appoint standing committee chairmen from amongst its own numbers. He rejoined the party in October 1986, but left again after failing to be preselected in mid-1988.

References
 

Former electoral provinces of Western Australia